Instituto O'Higgins may refer to:

 Instituto O'Higgins (O'Higgins Institute) of Rancagua
 Instituto O'Higgins (O'Higgins Institute) of Maipú
 the Instituto O'Higginiano de Chile (O'Higginian Institute of Chile)